Marchiennes is a commune in the Nord department in northern France.
It was fictionally portrayed in Émile Zola's Germinal.

Heraldry

See also
Communes of the Nord department

References

External links

 Official website
 Tourist office

Communes of Nord (French department)
French Flanders